The Ladybird is a 1927 American silent crime film directed by Walter Lang and starring Betty Compson. It was produced by the B movie studio Chadwick Pictures. A print is housed in the Library of Congress collection.

Cast
 Betty Compson as Diane Wyman
 Malcolm McGregor as Duncan Spencer
 Sheldon Lewis as Spider
 Hank Mann as The Brother
 Leo White as Phillipe
 John Miljan as Jules Ranier
 Ruth Stonehouse as Lucille
 Joseph W. Girard as Jacob Gale (as Joseph Gerard)
 Jean De Briac as Jacques

References

External links
 
 
  Swedish language lobby poster

1927 films
1927 crime films
American crime films
American silent feature films
American black-and-white films
Films directed by Walter Lang
1920s English-language films
1920s American films